Esmaeil Abbasian Mehr (born 31 August 1989) is an Iranian professional futsal player.

Honours

Country 
 Grand Prix de Futsal
 Third Place (1): 2013

Club 
 AFC Futsal Club Championship
 Champion  (1): 2013 (Chonburi Blue Wave)
 Runners-up (1): 2014 (Chonburi Blue Wave)
 Thailand Futsal League
 Champion  (1): 2014 (Chonburi Blue Wave)

References

External links 
 FFIRI.ir
 

1989 births
Living people
Sportspeople from Mashhad
Iranian men's futsal players
Futsal goalkeepers
Elmo Adab FSC players
Farsh Ara FSC players
Shahrdari Saveh FSC players
Iranian expatriate futsal players
Iranian expatriate sportspeople in Thailand